Pelturagonia anolophium is a species of agamid lizard. It is endemic to Indonesia.

References

Pelturagonia
Reptiles of Indonesia
Reptiles described in 2019
Reptiles of Borneo